Mammillaria bocasana is a species of cactus in the subfamily Cactoideae. It is often sold as a "powder puff" cactus, and also as a "Powder Puff Pincushion." The plant is protected from collecting in the wild in Mexico.

Habitat 
In its natural habitat of Northern central Mexico, it is found between 1650–2300 meters above sea level. It grows on canyon walls, in volcanic rock and in semi-desert environs, often under bushes of native plants. It has been listed as "Least Concern" on the IUCN Red List of Threatened Species since 2009.

Description 
Mammillaria bocasana is hemispherical in shape. It has "white, hair-like spines" that cover up its radial and hooked central spines. During the spring and summer, it bears several cream-colored flowers. Later it bears a red cylindrical fruit that contains reddish-brown seeds which display partially lateral hilum. Its form can be variable, with many different varieties or subspecies.

Cultivation 
Mammillaria bocasana can be propagated from seed. As it grows, it offsets, creating large mounds. This cactus is prone to rot and can tolerate temperatures of -7 degrees Celsius (20 degrees Fahrenheit) for short amounts of time. It has gained the Royal Horticultural Society's Award of Garden Merit.

References

Plants described in 1853
bocasana